Sacra Music (stylized in all caps) is a Japanese record label subsidiary of Sony Music Entertainment Japan. The record label was established on April 1, 2017, specializing in anison music.

On September 25, 2021, SACRA MUSIC started an official YouTube channel with the mascot character VTuber "SACRA Rokuban-cho" voiced by Sally Amaki. This character is responsible for sharing the latest news of SACRA MUSIC.

Currently Attached Artists

Formerly Attached Artists

References

External links
 
 

Sony Music Entertainment Japan
Sony subsidiaries
Japanese record labels
Record labels established in 2017